Stade Ali Zouaoui is a multi-use stadium in Kairouan, Tunisia. It was used by football team Jeunesse Sportive Kairouanaise until 1999. The stadium holds 15,000 people. It was named after economist and football executive originated from Kairouan Governorate Ali Zouaoui.

Kairouan Ali Zouaoui
Kairouan
JS Kairouan